Khalpili Islands (Ostrova Khalpili) is an archipelago in the Sea of Okhotsk of the North Pacific region, in Northeast Asia.

Geography

The group consists of two main islets and several smaller islets and rocks. Administratively the islands are within the Magadan Oblast of the Far Eastern Federal District, Russia.

See also
Islands of the Sea of Okhotsk
Islands of the Russian Far East

References

Islands of the Sea of Okhotsk
Archipelagoes of the Pacific Ocean
Islands of the Russian Far East
Archipelagoes of Magadan Oblast
Uninhabited islands of Russia
Uninhabited islands of the Pacific Ocean